The United Nations Statistics Division (UNSD), formerly the United Nations Statistical Office, serves under the United Nations Department of Economic and Social Affairs (DESA) as the central mechanism within the Secretariat of the United Nations to supply the statistical needs and coordinating activities of the global statistical system. The Division is overseen by the United Nations Statistical Commission, established in 1947, as the apex entity of the global statistical system and highest decision making body for coordinating international statistical activities. It brings together the Chief Statisticians from member states from around the world.

The Division compiles and disseminates global statistical information, develops standards and norms for statistical activities, and supports countries’ efforts to strengthen their national statistical systems.

The Division regularly publishes data updates, including the Statistical Yearbook and World Statistics Pocketbook, and books and reports on statistics and statistical methods. Many of the Division's databases are also available at its site (See below), as electronic publications and data files in the form of CD-ROMs, diskettes and magnetic tapes, or as printed publications. UNdata, a new  internet-based data service for the global user community brings UN Statistical databases within easy reach of users through a single entry point. Users can search and download a variety of statistical resources of the UN system.

Directors 

Including acting directors:

Topics
Economy
Industry Statistics
Energy Statistics
Trade Statistics
...
Environment
Environment Statistics
...
Development Indicators
 Sustainable Development Goal indicators 
...

PET Lab 
UNSD leads the Privacy-Enhancing Technologies Lab (PET Lab), which in turn drives TrustworthyAI together with ITU.

See also

Classification of the Functions of Government
International Standard Industrial Classification
UN M49
United Nations geoscheme
List of national and international statistical services
Committee for the Coordination of Statistical Activities
United Nations
United Nations Group of Experts on Geographical Names

References

External links

United Nations Department of Economic and Social Affairs
United Nations Economic and social development
United Nations Statistical Commission
UNdata
UN Comtrade

Statistical organizations
Statistics Division